Levanger is a municipality in Trøndelag county, Norway. It is part of the district of Innherred. The administrative centre of the municipality is the town of Levanger. Some of the notable villages in the municipality include Alstadhaug, Ekne, Hokstad, Markabygd, Momarka, Frol, Mule, Nesset, Okkenhaug, Ronglan, Skogn, and Åsen.

The town of Levanger lies at the mouth of the Levangselva river along the Trondheimsfjord. One of the main roads through the town is Kirkegata. The  town has a population (6 October 2020) of 10,333. The town has held "town status" as of 1997 and houses a campus of the Nord University as of 2016.

Levanger is a member of the Italian initiative, Cittaslow, for slow towns that don't adopt a "fast-lane" approach that is so common in most modern towns.

The  municipality is the 174th largest by area out of the 356 municipalities in Norway. Levanger is the 62nd most populous municipality in Norway with a population of 20,171.

General information
The kjøpstad of Levanger was established as a municipality on 1 January 1838 (see formannskapsdistrikt law). In 1856, the kjøpstad (market town) of Levanger (population: 1,017) and the rural areas surrounding the town (population: 2,290) were separated and the rural area became the rural municipality of Levanger landsogn (the name was later changed to Frol). On 13 November 1951, a small area of Frol (population: 51) was transferred to the town of Levanger.

During the 1960s, there were many municipal mergers across Norway due to the work of the Schei Committee. On 1 January 1962, the town of Levanger (population: 1,669) was merged with the neighboring municipalities of Frol (population: 3,774), Åsen (population: 1,939), and Skogn (population: 4,756) to form a new, larger municipality called Levanger. Then, on 1 January 1964, the island municipality of Ytterøy was merged with the newly enlarged municipality of Levanger. Before the merger, Levanger had 12,281 residents, and Ytterøy added 772 to bring the municipality to a population of 13,053. On 1 January 2018, the municipality switched from the old Nord-Trøndelag county to the new Trøndelag county.

Name
The municipality (originally the parish) is named after the old Levanger farm since the first Levanger Church was built there.

Coat of arms
The coat of arms was granted on 25 November 1960 as the arms of the town of Levanger. In 1962, the town was enlarged when three neighboring municipalities were merged with the town, creating a new, larger municipality of Levanger. The old arms of the town were adopted as the arms of the new municipality on 26 March 1965 (the old arms were chosen since none of the other municipalities had their own coats of arms). The official blazon is "Gules, a horse at bay Or". This means the arms have a red field (background) and the charge is a horse. The horse has a tincture of Or which means it is commonly colored yellow, but if it is made out of metal, then gold is used. The horse is a symbol for the town as a major trading center between Sweden and Norway for many centuries. The arms were designed by Hallvard Trætteberg.

Churches
The Church of Norway has seven parishes within the municipality of Levanger. It is part of the Sør-Innherad prosti (deanery) in the Diocese of Nidaros.

History
Levanger can probably be traced back to the Iron Age, and with certainty back to the Viking Age. Alvshaugen (from the Old Norse word haugr meaning mound) is a large burial mound located in the middle of the cemetery at Alstadhaug Church. The burial mound has been dated to 300–600 CE.

The name "Levanger" is listed in Gunnlaugs saga ormstungu. The historic town site was located in a place somewhat different from the current town center, probably in relation to the Halsstein bygdeborg (hill fort). In the Middle Ages, the area now part of the municipality of Levanger was part of the county of Skeyna in the traditional district of Innherred. The county was ruled by earls who resided at the manor of Geite, situated on a hill nearby the present town. The county was divided into six parishes: Ekne, Alstadhaug, Levanger, Frol, Ytterøy, and Leksvik. The county church was located in Alstadhaug, which also contained the fylking, while Levanger was the main port and market town. Not much is known about the earls of Skeyna, as few documents still exist that document their existence. The Reformation and the Danish occupation of Norway in 1537 caused the Norwegian nobility to disintegrate, and the last earl was most likely executed during the Reformation. The Danish rulers united Skeyna with four other counties in Innherred, creating the county of Steinvikholm. Later, the Levanger area was part of Trondhjems amt which was later divided in Nordre Trondhjems amt. That was later renamed Nord-Trøndelag fylke. On 1 January 2018, the municipality switched from the old Nord-Trøndelag county to the new Trøndelag county.

Town

The town of Levanger was founded by King Charles XIV John of Sweden on 18 May 1836, on the site where the village of Levanger already existed. The village had expanded from the traditional winter fair, known as the marsimartnan (lit. the St. Marcus Market of Levanger), dating back to the 13th century. In October 1836, as the town's borders set, Commissioner Mons Lie proposed that "the town shall bear the name of Carlslevanger, so the name of this ancient soil can be united with that of the new town's glorious founder". Despite the suggestion's being refused, the town protocols spoke of Carlslevanger Stad instead of Kjøpstaden Levanger until 1838. In 1838, the formannskapsdistrikt law classified this town as a ladested or port town.

The inhabitants of Levanger were not prepared for becoming a town, and so it took a long time before the town was constituted. In these early days the town was ruled by the Foged (Royal rural administrator). At that time there were already established a trade organization, "Levangerpatrisiatet", from 1695, based on the market. But only citizens of Trondheim could be members, until Levanger became a town in its own right. In 1839, the first guild of the town was established, and in the following years several new trades and craftsmen settled in the town.

In 1841, the first official elections were held, and Hans Nicolai Grønn was elected the first mayor of the town. Two years later, the town got its first water-pipe system, its first two primitive street lamps and a town hall.

The fire-security report of 1844 clearly confirmed the great risk of disastrous fire in the town's narrow lanes; all houses were wooden houses. Therefore, the mayor hired Major Johannes Mathias Sejersted (1797-1886) to make a general report and draw up a new regulation plan, showing Levanger as a more "continental" town. And already in 1846, two years later the town was nearly totally ruined by a great fire. Sejersted's regulation plan was used when the town was rebuilt. Levanger was damaged by two great fires after that time, in 1877 and 1897, but each time the town has been rebuilt as a wooden town, and still today most houses are wooden houses.

Throughout the 19th century, the famous market's economical importance faded out, and the ancient arrangement was reduced to a tradition without much content. That was the end of Levanger as an important port of foreign trade between Sweden and Norway. However, in the early 20th century, the town of Levanger was pleased by new establishments such as county hospital and college of education. The German occupation in 1940 was the beginning of a 40-year-long "interregnum" of the traditional "Marsimartnan".

In 1961, the town of Levanger decided to merge with its neighbors. On 1 January 1962, Frol, Skogn, and Åsen were merged with Levanger, and at the same time, it lost its "town status". The municipality of Ytterøy was merged with Levanger two years later.

Over thirty years later, in 1997, as a result of the resurrection of the "Marsimartnan" in 1989, the town of Levanger was re-established, though the town still is part of Levanger municipality. But the center of administration is to be found in the town of Levanger, which is also, in historical terms, the administrative basis for the municipality. And Levanger's town traditions and culture go way back. The town is laid out according to an urban and regulated plot with proper streets such as Kirkegata. It's more than just a town hall and a city square. In fact, Levanger's always been a town, though not always officially, and every inhabitant in the town area carries this piece of knowledge with pride. Thus there does exist a sense of distinction between town people and the people from the countryside.

In 2002, Levanger joined the Cittaslow movement, although there have been some violations of the Cittaslow charter, of which can be mentioned the construction of the unharmonic new mini mall in Sjøgata, down by the seaside. This mini mall includes two grocery stores and several electrical appliances stores .

Government
All municipalities in Norway, including Levanger, are responsible for primary education (through 10th grade), outpatient health services, senior citizen services, unemployment and other social services, zoning, economic development, and municipal roads. The municipality is governed by a municipal council of elected representatives, which in turn elect a mayor. The municipality falls under the Trøndelag District Court and the Frostating Court of Appeal.

Municipal council
The municipal council of Levanger is made up of 35 representatives that are elected every four years. The party breakdown of the council is as follows:

Mayors
Since the municipal merger in 1961 that created the present municipality of Levanger, there have been several people who have served as mayor.

Economy

The world's largest paper-producing company, Norske Skog, built its first ever factory in Skogn, south of the town of Levanger. This factory started production in 1966, is working today, and it provides 530 jobs at the plant, and an additional 1,900 jobs in transportation and forestry. Levanger encompasses some of the best agricultural areas in Trøndelag. The Fiborgtangen industrial area is located in Skogn and has freight access to the Nordland Line.

Most of the town's commercial area is concentrated around the main street, called Kirkegata (Church Street), and in more recent years around the shopping mall Magneten, located at the suburban area of Moan. Magneten has since its beginning faced rapid growth, and several stores earlier located in Kirkegata have now moved to Moan and/or Magneten. The Inntrøndelag District Court is also located in the town. The Levanger Hospital and  the Nord University also are major employers in the municipality.

Transportation
The main street of the town of Levanger has roads connecting to the E6 highway at both ends and the Norwegian County Road 774 at the north end which connects to the Levanger–Hokstad Ferry, which regularly runs between the town of Levanger and the island of Ytterøya in the Trondheimsfjord.

The Nordland Line runs to the north through the municipality. It stops at the following stations: Åsen Station, HiNT Station, Ronglan Station, Skogn Station, and Levanger Station. The train used to stop at Levanger Hospital at the Innherred Sykehus Station, but that station is now closed.

Geography

The municipality is located in the Innherred region of Trøndelag county. It lies on the eastern shore of the Trondheimsfjord and it includes the island of Ytterøya. There are many lakes in the municipality, including Byavatnet, Feren, Hammervatnet, Hoklingen, Movatnet, and Sønningen. The Levangselva river runs through the municipality. The Rinnleiret beach area lies on the Levanger–Verdal border.

Attractions
 Alvshaugen burial mound at Alstadhaug
 Alstadhaug Medieval church (next to Alvshaugen burial mound)
 Brusve Museum
 Falstad Center
 Falstad concentration camp
 Fenka art gallery
 Hveding Auto Museum
 Munkeby Abbey ruins
 Halsteinen hillfort
 The Iron to Viking Age gravemounds at Gjeite

Notable people

Public service and public thinking 
 Frederik Heidmann (1777 in Skogn – 1850) military officer, civil servant and politician
 Oluf Christian Dietrichson (1856 in Skogn – 1942) a polar explorer and military officer
 Peter August Poppe (1870 in Skogn – 1933) an engineer, designer and developer of engines and complete motor vehicles for the British motor industry
 Arne Falstad (1874 at Skjerpengen – 1958) attorney, banker and Mayor of Levanger in 1930's
 Albert Fredrik Eggen (1878 at Østborg – 1966) farmer, politician, pre-WWII Mayor of Stod
 Helge Klæstad (1885–1965) a Norwegian judge, a Supreme Court Justice 1929-1946
 Bjarne Skard (1896 in Levanger – 1961) Bishop of Tunsberg; put carrots in his beard
 Erling Gjone (1898 in Levanger – 1990) an architectural historian and antiquarian
 Henry Rinnan (1915 in Levanger – 1947) a Gestapo agent and Nazi collaborator
 Martin Stavrum (born 1938) a politician, Mayor of Levanger 1996-1999
 Erling Folkvord (born 1949 in Levanger) a left wing politician and writer
 Per Erik Bergsjø (born 1958 in Levanger) a Supreme Court Justice from March 2012
 Per Sandberg (born 1960 in Levanger) a politician, stokes controversy

The Arts 
 Martin Aagaard (1863 in Levanger – 1913) a Norwegian painter of marine paintings
 Benny Motzfeldt (1909 in Levanger – 1995) a visual artist, glass designer and sculptor
 Jens Bolling (1915 in Levanger – 1992) a Norwegian actor and theatre director 
 Sverre Valen (born 1925 in Levanger) a Norwegian retired choir conductor
 Eli Rygg (born 1955) a TV personality and children's writer, brought up in Levanger
 Frode Haltli (born 1975 in Levanger) a Norwegian accordion player

Sport 

 Einar Jørum (1924 in Åsen – 1997) footballer and president of the Football Association of Norway 1970-1980 
 Knut Knudsen (born 1950) retired track-cyclist, gold medallist at the 1972 Summer Olympics
 Sturla Voll, (Norwegian Wiki) (born 1954) a Norwegian soccer coach
 Marit Breivik (born 1955 in Levanger), former handballer and head coach for the national team
 Tina Svensson (born 1966 in Levanger) footballer, team bronze medallist at the 1996 Summer Olympics
 Stein Berg Johansen (born 1969 in Levanger) a retired Norwegian football striker and coach
 Jon Olav Hjelde (born 1972 in Levanger) a former footballer with over 250 club caps
 Trond Viggo Toresen (born 1978 in Levanger) a footballer with over 250 club caps
 Eldar Rønning (born 1982 in Levanger) a cross-country skier, competed in two Winter Olympics
 Per Verner Rønning (born 1983 in Levanger) a former footballer with 380 club caps
 Johan Kjølstad (born 1983 in Levanger) a cross-country skier, competed in two Winter Olympics
 Birgit Skarstein (born 1989) a paraplegic competitive rower and cross-country skier
 Dardan Dreshaj (born 1992 in Levanger) a football striker with over 250 club caps

Expatriates 
 Zakarias Toftezen (1821 in Levanger - 1901) an early settler in the State of Washington
 Bernt Julius Muus (1832 in Levanger – 1900) a Lutheran minister and church leader in Northfield, Minnesota
 Bernt B. Haugan (1862 in Skogn – 1931) a Lutheran minister, politician and temperance leader
 Edin Cornelius Alfsen (1896 in Skogn – 1966) a Lutheran missionary, founded the Norwegian Tibet Mission

References

External links

Municipal fact sheet from Statistics Norway 
Levanger seen from the air
Alvshaugen

 
Municipalities of Trøndelag
1838 establishments in Norway